The varied difficulties experienced by the copper industry after the depths of the Great Depression were followed by the idea of getting relief through some form of collective action in order to reduce the intensity of competition. In this way on March, 28th, 1935, the International Copper Cartel (ICC)  was formed. There were five members in the cartel and two friendly foreign observers. The voting members were: Anaconda Copper (United States), Kennecott Copper (United States), Roan Antelope Copper (Northern Rhodesia), Rhokana Corporation (Northern Rhodesia) and the Union Minière du Haut-Katanga (Belgian Congo), while the non voting members were Bor (Yugoslavia) and Rio Tinto (Spain).  Combined, these seven companies accounted for more than half of the global output of refined copper at that time. The main difference between this and the previous copper cartels is that the ICC members did not attempt to set uniform prices. Rather, they merely wanted to influence prices indirectly, smoothing out wide price fluctuations (Walters, 1944). Despite the immense profits earned by the ICC's members in the following decades, the ICC was never reproached for charging exorbitant prices, as opposed to what happened in the case of previous cartels. Indeed, in Herfindahl’s opinion the cartel did not have any significant effect on price. These are born out in USGS annual price data showing the annual average price of copper in US Dollar per pound (2204.3 lb per metric ton), if one adjusts for the US Consumer Price Index.  

Herfindahl (1959) posits that the cartel members returned to the Nash-Cournot competition once the pivotal or trigger price was exceeded. On the other hand, Montero and Guzmán (2005) posit that the cooperative behavior could have continued in booms, but using output-expanding strategies in order to restrict the entry of the competitive fringe.

Further reading 

 Herfindahl, O.C. (1959). Copper Costs and Prices: 1870 – 1957. The Johns Hopkins Press, Baltimore.
 Walters, A. (1944). The International Copper Cartel. Southern Economic Journal 11, 133-156.
 Montero, J.-P. and Guzmán, J.I. Welfare-enhancing collusion in the presence of a competitive fringe.
 Guzmán, J.I. (2007). The International Copper Cartel, 1935–1939: the good cartel? Working paper, Mining Center, Catholic University of Chile

See also 
 Copper cartels
 World Copper Agreement

International economic organizations
Copper cartels
Organizations established in 1935